Tutaibo is a genus of sheet weavers that was first described by Ralph Vary Chamberlin in 1916.

Species
 it contains ten species:
Tutaibo anglicanus (Hentz, 1850) – USA
Tutaibo debilipes Chamberlin, 1916 (type) – Peru
Tutaibo formosus Millidge, 1991 – Peru
Tutaibo fucosus (Keyserling, 1891) – Brazil
Tutaibo niger (O. Pickard-Cambridge, 1882) – Brazil
Tutaibo phoeniceus (O. Pickard-Cambridge, 1894) – Mexico, Guatemala
Tutaibo pullus Millidge, 1991 – Colombia
Tutaibo rubescens Millidge, 1991 – Colombia
Tutaibo rusticellus (Keyserling, 1891) – Brazil
Tutaibo velox (Keyserling, 1886) – Brazil

See also
 List of Linyphiidae species (Q–Z)

References

Araneomorphae genera
Linyphiidae
Spiders of North America
Spiders of South America